Pseudocriopsis modesta is a species of beetle in the family Cerambycidae, the only species in the genus Pseudocriopsis.

References

Acanthocinini